Clematis foetida is a New Zealand endemic vine. Contrary to its scientific name C. foetida, its flowers are pleasantly perfumed.

References

foetida
Flora of New Zealand